Julia de la Cruz Mena Rivera (born 3 April 1950) is a Nicaraguan politician.

Background and earlier career

Her profession was as a school teacher.

She was a deputy in National Assembly of Nicaragua from 1990 to 1995 and also served as first vice president of National Assembly. She was a member of the Independent Liberal Party.

Vice President of Nicaragua (1995-1997) 

In 1995 National Assembly elected her as Vice President following resignation of Virgilio Godoy for the remainder of the term until January 1997.

Later career 
Later she joined Sandinista National Liberation Front, and has served as their deputy, and also as Mayor of Granada as a Sandinista.

References

1950 births
Living people
Vice presidents of Nicaragua
Members of the National Assembly (Nicaragua)
Independent Liberal Party (Nicaragua) politicians
Sandinista National Liberation Front politicians
20th-century Nicaraguan women politicians
20th-century Nicaraguan politicians
Women vice presidents
Mayors of places in Nicaragua